Cypress Grove (born 1959 in London) is an English musician, singer, songwriter, composer and producer.

Biography
Cypress Grove was born into a musical family. He was taught by his father, a professional jazz drummer, to play drums from a very early age, but by the time he turned 16, his passion became the guitar.

Musical career

As his passion for the guitar developed he became infatuated with pre-war acoustic blues. This led to an encounter in 1988 with Jeffrey Lee Pierce from The Gun Club who shared similar interests and which grew into a collaboration on an album of roots material, Ramblin' Jeffrey Lee and Cypress Grove with Willie Love in 1992. Cypress and Jeffrey went on to tour the album both with a band and as an acoustic duo.

In October 1994, Pierce and Grove were filmed for Henri-Jean Debon's Hard Times Killin' Floor Blues The film was eventually released in 2008.

Ten years after Pierce died of a brain hemorrhage in 1996, Cypress discovered a tape of them rehearsing songs that Jeffrey had written. These were works in progress, and while the quality was deemed too poor for release, Cypress invited a number of musicians to record the songs properly and help him complete them. This series became known as The Jeffrey Lee Pierce Session Project, an endeavour that has currently produced three albums.
 
Grove has recorded with a number of musicians including Nick Cave, Debbie Harry, Chris Stein, Mark Lanegan, Iggy Pop, Isobel Campbell, Thurston Moore, Warren Ellis, The Raveonettes, Crippled Black Phoenix, Mick Harvey, David Eugene Edwards, Hugo Race, Bertrand Cantat, Barry Adamson, Lydia Lunch, Jim Sclavunos, Mark Stewart and James Johnston.

In 2010, Cypress Grove and Lydia Lunch recorded A Fistful of Desert Blues.

In 2017 they get together once again to record a covers album called Under The Covers.

In 2019 he wrote and performed the song "The Singing Tree" for the feature film Lucania by Gigi Roccati.

Discography
Ramblin' Jeffrey Lee & Cypress Grove With Willie Love with Ramblin' Jeffrey Lee (Jeffrey Lee Pierce), 1992
A Fistful of Desert Blues with Lydia Lunch, 2010 
Twin Horses with Lydia Lunch and Spiritual Front, 2015 
Under the Covers with Lydia Lunch, 2017

The Jeffrey Lee Pierce Sessions Project
We Are Only Riders, 2009
The Journey Is Long, 2012
Axels & Sockets, 2014

Bibliography
Cave and the Seventh Art: The cinematic imagination in Kinchin-Smith S (eds) Read Write [Hand]: A Multi-Disciplinary Nick Cave Reader, Silkworms Ink, 2012, 36-38
The Curtains Parting in Kinchin-Smith S (eds) Read Write [Hand]: A Multi-Disciplinary Nick Cave Reader, Silkworms Ink, 2012, 126-129
Preface to Gun Club, 24 Histoires pour Jeffrey Lee Pierce

References

1959 births
Living people
English blues guitarists
English blues singers
English record producers
Alternative rock guitarists
Alumni of University College London